Matthew 12:7 is the seventh verse in the twelfth chapter of the Gospel of Matthew in the New Testament.

Content
In the original Greek according to Westcott-Hort, this verse is:
Εἰ δὲ ἐγνώκειτε τί ἐστιν, Ἔλεον θέλω καὶ οὐ θυσίαν, οὐκ ἂν κατεδικάσατε τοὺς ἀναιτίους.  

In the King James Version of the Bible the text reads:
But if ye had known what this meaneth, I will have mercy, and not sacrifice, ye would not have condemned the guiltless.

The New International Version translates the passage as:
If you had known what these words mean, 'I desire mercy, not sacrifice,' you would not have condemned the innocent.

Analysis
Jesus here cites Hosea 6:6, which argues that mercy is more powerful, and better than to sacrifice on the Sabbath. Thus it is lawful to violate the Sabbath rest. It was said that the world is supported by three things, 1) by the law, 2) by Divine worship, 3) by mercy.

Commentary from the Church Fathers
Chrysostom: " And because what He had said seemed hard to those that heard it, He again exhorts to mercy, introducing His discourse with emphasis, saying, But had ye known what that meaneth, I will have mercy and not sacrifice, ye would never have condemned the innocent."

Jerome: " What I will have mercy, and not sacrifice, signifies, we have explained above. The words, Ye mould never have condemned the innocent, are to be referred to the Apostles, and the meaning is, If ye allow the mercy of Achimelech, in that he refreshed David when in danger of famishing, why do ye condemn My disciples?"

References

External links
Other translations of Matthew 12:7 at BibleHub

012:7